Athanasios Michalopoulos (born September 29, 1973) is an Olympic beach volleyball player from Greece. He competed in the 2004 Summer Olympics.

In 2004, Michalopoulos and his partner Pavlos Beligratis were eliminated in the first round of the Olympic beach volleyball tournament.

External links
 Athens 2004 profile at Yahoo Sports
 
 
 
 

1973 births
Living people
Olympiacos S.C. players
Beach volleyball players at the 2004 Summer Olympics
Greek beach volleyball players
Olympic beach volleyball players of Greece
Greek men's volleyball players